Immigration to South Korea is low due to restrictive immigration policies resulting from strong opposition to immigrants from the general Korean public. However, in recent years the influx of immigrants into South Korea has been rising rapidly, with foreign residents accounting for 4.9% of the total population in 2019, double that of a decade ago. According to the United Nations, in 2019 foreign born residents represented 2.3% of the total population, which is below the world average of 3.5%.

History
Those who have at least one South Korean parent are automatically granted South Korean nationality from birth, regardless of their decisions on whether to choose the nationality of the foreign parent or the country of birth (if born outside South Korea).

Requirements for General Naturalization include:
Must have had domicile address in South Korea for more than five consecutive years 
Must be a legal adult according to South Korean Civil Law 
Must have good conduct 
Must have the ability to maintain living on his/her own assets or skills; or is a dependent member of a family so capable. Applicants must have basic knowledge befitting a South Korean national; such as understanding of the Korean language, customs and culture

In 2007 the UN declared South Korea an official receiving country. The number of foreigners in South Korea grew from 390,000 in 1997 to 1 million in 2007. Among these are 630,000 temporary laborers, as well as 100,000 foreigners married to South Korean nationals. Furthermore, there are 230,000 illegal immigrants.

Main sending countries are Asian countries, such as China, Vietnam, Mongolia, the Philippines, Thailand, and Uzbekistan. There are also migrants from Nigeria, Ghana, Russia, and the United States.

Nominally, the South Korean government says it wants to create a multicultural society and foreigner-friendly environment.

Issues with current immigrant policies

As described in the new national plan for immigration policy, the government claims a "world-class South Korea" welcoming of foreigners. However, critics argue that the government's goals and policies are fundamentally discriminatory, stemming from racist attitudes in the country and ethnic nationalism. In response, the South Korean government introduced new regulations in April 2014, which meant foreign spouses would have to pass a Korean-language proficiency test and earn a minimum wage of $14,000.

Temporary workers and illegal immigrants 
Since 1991 South Korea has experienced a large influx of foreign workers. Approximately 10,000 Asian workers came to South Korea under a newly established trainee program in 1992. In June 1996, there were 57,000 trainees in South Korea. Despite its growth, the trainee program also had problems—namely that the trainees became undocumented workers due to wage differentials, and that they were not protected by the Labor Standard Law as they were not considered laborers.

Since 2004, the South Korean government has followed the "Employment Permit Program" for foreigners, the product of a decade of interaction between Korean citizens and foreign migrant workers. Legally, foreigners are allowed to enter mainly to fulfill low-wage jobs, and they are excluded from receiving social services. Public opinion data shows that Korean citizens retain a discriminatory attitude towards foreign workers.

Immigration violations of human rights 
There are many reports from legal and illegal immigrants which have jailed in many prisons in South Korea because of small problems or misunderstanding their visas for long time. Also, there are some reports about beating and abusing the prisoners. South Korea immigration however paid for the deportation ticket and made sure they are integrated in their new homes.

Foreign brides and children of multiethnic families 
Foreign brides and their multicultural children are growing into a major political issue. Sending countries are likely to worry about their immigrants due to deep-rooted discrimination against foreigners in South Korea. Now, most immigration into South Korea comes from Southeast Asia, and immigrant treatment, particularly if there is abuse of foreign brides, is likely to provoke not only domestic problems, but also diplomatic tension. What immigration there has been, is frequently so focused on the birth-rate problem that it is more properly called bride-importing than immigration.

The term "onnurian" refer to a person of mixed heritage, most commonly applied to children of a South Korean father and a Southeast Asian mother. Another term, "Kosian", was coined in 1997 by intercultural families to refer to themselves, but its use spread in the early 2000s as international marriages became increasingly common in rural areas. The term is now considered offensive by some who prefer to identify simply as ethnically Korean.

South Korean men have married women from post-Soviet states such as Russia, Uzbekistan and Kyrgyzstan within Korea significantly more than the reverse.

Number of spouses from western countries settling in the country with South Korean spouses has also been on a consistent rise.

Spouses of South Korean nationals can acquire South Korean citizenship more easily than other foreigners, which encourages thousands of spouses to naturalize every year.

The government of South Korea initiated a discussion whether to establish independent Immigration Office to accommodate fast-growing immigration and to prepare inclusive and rational immigration policies, from 2003, without progress. The Foreigner Policy Committee headed by the South Korean prime minister is responsible for coordinating the country's policies concerning foreigners, which had formerly been handled by multiple ministries. However, its role is limited due to a shortage of resources and manpower. Establishing an Immigration Office is expected to solve these problems by concentrating all the related resources and manpower under one umbrella.

According to the UN Recommendations on Statistics of International Migration (revised in 1998), long-term international immigration is recorded after an individual enters a country and establishes his usual place of residence there for more than a year. Therefore, when the South Korea government builds new policies, immigrant laborers and children of illegal migrants should be counted to follow this guideline.

South Korea is a signatory to the 1951 Convention relating to the Status of Refugees. The South Korean government is the ultimate authority to determine who is eligible to receive refugee status in South Korea.

Migrant laborers

South Korea used to be a net sender of immigrants until 2007, sending farmers, miners, nurses, and workers to the United States, Germany, and the Middle East. The ethnic Korean diaspora numbers 7.49 million as of 2019, including 2.54 million in the United States and 2.46 million in China.

South Korea experienced government-initiated rapid economic growth from the 1960s on, which has been called the "Miracle on the Han River". Until the end of 1980s, South Korea was able to sustain its growth without foreign laborers because of its abundant young population and low wages. But starting from the 1990s, South Korea's plummeting birth rate and growing cost of labor caused labor shortages especially in the so-called "3D jobs" (for "dirty, dangerous, and difficult"), which translated into demand for foreign labor.
  
Economic development and urbanization led many people to leave rural areas and move to cites. However, according to traditional Confucian norms which a lot of older South Koreans still adhere to, the eldest son must remain with his parents. Chronic shortages of women arose in rural areas, and international marriages began to fill this unmet demand.

Many migrant workers live in the industrial suburbs of Gyeonggi Province such as Siheung and Ansan, where foreigners account for 7.6% of the population.

Statistics

Nationality of immigrants
There are 2,524,656 foreign residents in South Korea as of December 2019. These figures exclude foreign-born citizens who have naturalized and obtained South Korean citizenship; the total number of naturalized South Korean citizens surpassed 200,000 in 2019. Among these numbers, 792,853 of these people are short-term residents.

Ethnic Koreans with foreign citizenship
Ethnic Koreans from overseas started immigrating to South Korea in large numbers, especially from the 2000s. These immigrants mainly include ethnic Koreans from China and the former Soviet Union, along with Korean Americans. They can apply for F-4 visa which grants them the ability to work and live more freely than other foreigners.

Foreign spouses
Foreign husbands and wives married to South Koreans living in South Korea as of 2019. This figure excludes those who have naturalized and obtained South Korean citizenship; 135,056 foreign-born spouses have naturalized until 2019.

See also
Demographics of South Korea
Foreigners in Korea
Refugees in South Korea
Racism in South Korea

Notes and references

External links
Korea Immigration Service

 
Demographics of South Korea
Society of South Korea